The McNabb-Mallory rule (sometimes referred to as just the ''Mallory'' rule) refers to the U.S. rule of evidence that a confession is inadmissible if obtained during an unreasonably long period of detention between arrest and initial court appearance.

The rule was largely superseded by the broader protections provided for under the Miranda rules.

References

United States criminal investigation law